West Aberdeenshire and Kincardine may mean or refer to:

 West Aberdeenshire and Kincardine (UK Parliament constituency)
 West Aberdeenshire and Kincardine (Scottish Parliament constituency)